The 2017 PDC Unicorn Challenge Tour consisted of 20 darts tournaments on the 2017 PDC Pro Tour.

Prize money
The prize money for the Challenge Tour events remained the same from 2016, with each event having a prize fund of £10,000.

This is how the prize money is divided:

March

Challenge Tour 1
Challenge Tour 1 was contested on Saturday 25 March 2017 at the Arena MK in Milton Keynes.

Challenge Tour 2
Challenge Tour 2 was contested on Saturday 25 March 2017 at the Arena MK in Milton Keynes.

Challenge Tour 3
Challenge Tour 3 was contested on Sunday 26 March 2017 at the Arena MK in Milton Keynes.

Challenge Tour 4
Challenge Tour 4 was contested on Sunday 26 March 2017 at the Arena MK in Milton Keynes.

April

Challenge Tour 5
Challenge Tour 5 was contested on Saturday 15 April 2017 at the Barnsley Metrodome in Barnsley.

Challenge Tour 6
Challenge Tour 6 was contested on Saturday 15 April 2017 at the Barnsley Metrodome in Barnsley.

Challenge Tour 7
Challenge Tour 7 was contested on Sunday 16 April 2017 at the Barnsley Metrodome in Barnsley.

Challenge Tour 8
Challenge Tour 8 was contested on Sunday 16 April 2017 at the Barnsley Metrodome in Barnsley.

May

Challenge Tour 9
Challenge Tour 9 was contested on Saturday 13 May 2017 at the Arena MK in Milton Keynes.

Challenge Tour 10
Challenge Tour 10 was contested on Saturday 13 May 2017 at the Arena MK in Milton Keynes.

Challenge Tour 11
Challenge Tour 11 was contested on Sunday 14 May 2017 at the Arena MK in Milton Keynes.

Challenge Tour 12
Challenge Tour 12 was contested on Sunday 14 May 2017 at the Arena MK in Milton Keynes.

June

Challenge Tour 13
Challenge Tour 13 was contested on Saturday 10 June 2017 at the Arena MK in Milton Keynes.

Challenge Tour 14
Challenge Tour 14 was contested on Saturday 10 June 2017 at the Arena MK in Milton Keynes.

Challenge Tour 15
Challenge Tour 15 was contested on Sunday 11 June 2017 at the Arena MK in Milton Keynes.

Challenge Tour 16
Challenge Tour 16 was contested on Sunday 11 June 2017 at the Arena MK in Milton Keynes.

September

Challenge Tour 17
Challenge Tour 17 was contested on Saturday 9 September 2017 at the Robin Park Tennis Centre in Wigan.

Challenge Tour 18
Challenge Tour 18 was contested on Saturday 9 September 2017 at the Robin Park Tennis Centre in Wigan.

Challenge Tour 19
Challenge Tour 19 was contested on Sunday 10 September 2017 at the Robin Park Tennis Centre in Wigan.

Challenge Tour 20
Challenge Tour 20 was contested on Sunday 10 September 2017 at the Robin Park Tennis Centre in Wigan.

References

2017 in darts
2017 PDC Pro Tour